Hermann Ernst Freund (15 October 1786, in Uthlede, Lower Saxony – 30 June 1840, in Copenhagen) was a German-born Danish sculptor. He is remembered in particular for his figures from Nordic mythology and for the Ragnarok Frieze.

Biography

Born near Bremen, Germany, Freund was trained as a smith before studying at the Art Academy in Copenhagen where he was awarded all four silver and gold medals. After graduating, he spent 10 years in Rome where he became Bertel Thorvaldsen's closest assistant as can be seen in his marble bust of Bernhard Severin Ingemann (1820). An early proponent of romantic nationalism, Freund was the first Danish sculptor to work with Nordic mythology, creating 12 statuettes including Loki (1822), Odin (bronze 1827) and Thor (1829), all inspired by ancient Greek and Roman mythological works. On returning to Copenhagen, he organized the decoration of Church of Our Lady, preparing models for the figures of the 12 apostles but in the end Thorvaldsen received the commission. His masterpiece, the Ragnarok Frieze, which occupied him for many years, was completed by Herman Wilhelm Bissen after his death but was later destroyed by the Christianborg fire in 1884. There is a plaster cast of part of the frieze in Statens Museum for Kunst. The largest collection of his works is to be found at the Glyptotek in Copenhagen.

In 1829, Freund became a professor at the Academy. Inspired by time he spent in the south of Italy, Freund had his official home, Materialgaard, decorated in Pompeiian style. Young artists such as Georg Hilker, Heinrich Eddelien, Constantin Hansen and Christen Købke completed the work using Freund's designs.

Gallery

See also
Danish sculpture
 Mimir and Balder Consult the Norns

References

External links

Images of The Ragnarok Frieze

Danish male artists
1786 births
1840 deaths
Artists from Copenhagen
Artists from Bremen
Royal Danish Academy of Fine Arts alumni
19th-century Danish sculptors
German emigrants to Denmark
Academic staff of the Royal Danish Academy of Fine Arts
Male sculptors
19th-century Danish male artists